Faris Shafi is a Pakistani rapper and actor. 

He is son of actress Saba Hameed and brother of musician Meesha Shafi.

Performing in Urdu, English and Punjabi, and known for his lyrics than can be personal as well political, he's considered to be the pioneer of rap music in Pakistan.

Dramas 
 Andaaz-e-Sitam
 Be Inteha
 Churails
 Ghalati
 Kabhi Band Kabhi Baja
 Kabhi Kabhi (2013 TV series)
 Kitni Girhain Baaki Hain (season 2)
 Man Jali
 Meri Guriya
 Mere Huzoor (TV series)
 Qarz
 Sun Yaara

Film 
 The Legend of Maula Jatt as Mooda

Music 
 Jawaab De
 Cricket Khidaiye
 Muaziz Saarif in Coke Studio (Pakistani season 14)
 Yeh Dunya in Coke Studio (Pakistani season 14)
 Hum
 Muskura
 Jawab De
 Prosaic
 Awaam
 Introduction
 Lafz

References

External links 
 

Living people
Actors from Lahore
Singers from Lahore
Pakistani film actors
Pakistani television actors
Pakistani rappers
Punjabi people
Coke Studio (Pakistani TV program)
Actors in Urdu cinema
21st-century Pakistani actors
21st-century Pakistani singers
Year of birth missing (living people)